Melanohalea austroamericana is a species of foliose lichen in the family Parmeliaceae. It was described as a new species in 2016. The lichen is known only from two specimens collected in Chile's Laguna del Laja National Park, where they were discovered growing on bark in a forest of Chilean cedar. The specific epithet austroamericana refers to its South American distribution.

Although Melanohalea ushuaiensis is somewhat similar in appearance to Melanohalea austroamericana, the latter species is clearly distinguished from the former by the presence of both soredia and isidia.

References

austroamericana
Lichen species
Lichens described in 2016
Lichens of Chile
Taxa named by Helge Thorsten Lumbsch
Taxa named by Ana Crespo
Taxa named by Pradeep Kumar Divakar